Andalgalá is a city in the west-center of the province of Catamarca, Argentina, located in a valley near the Sierra de Aconquija, 260 km from the provincial capital San Fernando del Valle de Catamarca. It is the head town of the department of the same name. The Andalgalá River, which flows nearby, supports a hydroelectric power plant.

Andalgalá was founded as a fort on 12 July 1658, and only became a city in 1952. Its name is of Quechua origin and means either "Lord of the Hare" or "Lord of the High Mountain".

Climate
According to the Köppen Climate Classification system, Andalgalá has a semi-arid climate, abbreviated "BSk" on climate maps. Precipitation is mainly concentrated from November to March with 80% of the annual precipitation occurring in these months.

References

 
 Provincia de Catamarca — Official portal.
 Catamarca Huasi — Provincial portal. Details on the Andalgalá Department.
 Catamarca Guía
 Andalgala News

Populated places in Catamarca Province
Populated places established in 1658
Cities in Argentina
1658 establishments in the Spanish Empire
Argentina